The Gateway Bridge (locally called the South Bridge) is a suspension bridge over the Mississippi River in Clinton, Iowa, United States. It carries U.S. Route 30 from Iowa into Illinois just south of Fulton, Illinois. The bridge itself is two travel lanes wide.

Description
The Gateway Bridge is a steel suspension bridge that carries U.S. Route 30 from Clinton, Iowa to Fulton, Illinois. The consultant engineer to the bridge was the City of Clinton Commission. The bridge was financed by bonds, which expired in 1979.

History
The bridge was constructed from August 1954 to May 1956, and the bridge opened at the end of June 1956. Illinois Lieutenant Governor John William Chapman said that the bridge would have a "considerable impact on the improvement of the economic and traffic pattern of Iowa and Illinois". Iowa Governor Leo Hoegh called the bridge a "masterpiece in engineering" and praised Iowa for its role in the project. Henry O. Talle, a congressman who represented Iowa's 2nd congressional district, stated that the bridge opening was "something worthy to be remembered."

In 1982, the Illinois-Iowa Department of Transportation announced that tolls would be discontinued on the bridge.

Temporary closures 
From February to December 1999, the Gateway Bridge closed for a construction upgrade, which had an estimate cost of $10.6 million. It was closed in March 2006 for repainting and reconstruction of Route 30 on the Illinois side of the river, and reopened in November 2006. Traffic on U.S. Route 30 intending to cross the river was detoured north to the Lyons-Fulton Bridge. From October 1, 2018, to October 4, 2018, the lane on the bridge closed for bridge inspections.

See also 
List of crossings of the Upper Mississippi River
Clinton Railroad Bridge, a railroad swing bridge adjacent to the bridge

References

External links 

John Weeks' US-30 Gateway Bridge, Clinton IA page — this page contains pictures of the Gateway Bridge.
Gateway Bridge (South Bridge)

Suspension bridges in Iowa
Suspension bridges in Illinois
Bridges over the Mississippi River
U.S. Route 30
Road bridges in Illinois
Bridges of the United States Numbered Highway System
Bridges completed in 1956
Buildings and structures in Clinton, Iowa
Bridges in Clinton County, Iowa
Buildings and structures in Whiteside County, Illinois
Road bridges in Iowa
Former toll bridges in Iowa
Former toll bridges in Illinois
Towers in Iowa
Interstate vehicle bridges in the United States